Mark Merklein and Vincent Spadea were the defending champions, but lost in the quarterfinals this year.

Grant Stafford and Kevin Ullyett won the title, defeating Michael Tebbutt and Mikael Tillström 4–6, 6–4, 7–5 in the final.

Seeds

  Luke Jensen /  Murphy Jensen (quarterfinals)
  Dave Randall /  Jack Waite (first round)
  Wayne Black /  Maurice Ruah (first round)
  Michael Tebbutt /  Mikael Tillström (final)

Draw

Draw

External links
Draw

Doubles